Louisa Thomas (born 1981) is an American writer and sports journalist.

Life 
Thomas is the daughter of journalist and Newsweek editor Evan Thomas and Washington, D.C. attorney Oscie Thomas.

Thomas graduated from Harvard University. She is a contributor to The New Yorker and a former editor and writer at Grantland. Her work has appeared in The New York Times, The Wall Street Journal, Vogue, and The Paris Review. Thomas has published two books: 2017's Louisa: The Extraordinary Life of Mrs. Adams, a biography of First Lady Louisa Adams, and 2011's Conscience: Two Soldiers, Two Pacifists, One Family—a Test of Will and Faith in World War I, about the moral conflicts her family endured during World War I and focusing on her pacifist great-grandfather, Norman Thomas. She is a former fellow at New America.

Though much of Thomas's writing is on the subject of sports, it is influenced by her studies of poetry; she cites Wallace Stevens as a major influence.

Thomas's first marriage resulted in divorce. Her second is to mathematician and former NFL player John Urschel. They have one daughter. Urschel's autobiography, Mind and Matter: A Life in Math and Football, was co-written by Thomas and published in 2019.

Books

References

External links 

 Louisa Thomas articles at Grantland
 Louisa Thomas articles at The New Yorker

1982 births
Living people
American women writers
Harvard University alumni
21st-century American women